Yes Plus (styled as yes+) channel was an Israeli television channel that broadcast foreign (British and American) TV shows. It was available on yes, the Israeli satellite provider.

The channel aired on September 3, 2000, and broadcast the shows' new episodes on weeknights (Sunday - Thursday), and its re-runs on weekdays and weekends (Friday-Saturday).

As Part of the new re-brand of the foreign TV shows channels on yes, it was decided to cancel yes+. On March 3, 2007, yes+ has been canceled. On March 4, 2007, channel yes stars 1 - one of the three new yes stars channels on yes - replaced the channel.

External links

Television channels and stations established in 2000
Television channels and stations disestablished in 2007
Defunct television channels in Israel
Yes (Israel)